Lars Erik Ansgar Leijonborg (born 21 November 1949) is a Swedish politician, Minister for Higher Education and Research 2006-2009 and Head of the Ministry of Education and Research 2006–2007. During a ten-year period from 1997 to 2007, he served as chairman of the Liberal People's Party.

He announced on 11 June 2009 that he would be leaving the Cabinet of Fredrik Reinfeldt as soon as a successor was appointed. He was replaced by Tobias Krantz on 17 June 2009.

Biography 
Lars Leijonborg grew up in Solna north of Stockholm. In 1971 he became the leader of the Liberal Youth of Sweden (Liberala ungdomsförbundet), the Liberal Party's youth organisation. In 1974 he graduated from his studies in social work at Stockholm University. He was party secretary from 1980 to 1983 and editor-in-chief for the party magazine NU from 1983 to 1984. After a brief period as a management consultant, he was elected a member of the Riksdag (parliament) in 1985. In 1990 he became the party's second deputy chairman. Succeeding Maria Leissner, on 15 March 1997 he was unanimously elected chairman of the party.

In the 1998 parliamentary elections, Folkpartiet received 4.7% of the vote, just above the 4% threshold for parliamentary representation. It was the worst election result the party had seen since World War I. Even within the party, Leijonborg's position was questioned by many. The youth organisation he once headed openly called for his resignation. Despite the internal opposition, he managed to hold on to his position. And when, in the campaign before the 2002 parliamentary elections, the party suddenly surged after launching a proposal on making a Swedish language test one of the requirements for a naturalized Swedish citizenship, Leijonborg was nicknamed "the Lion King" (Leijonkungen) in the tabloids. The election result, 13.3%, was a success for the party and for Leijonborg personally, but since the party's centre-right partners failed to gain ground, the Social Democrats could remain in government. In 2006 the party was a part of the Alliance for Sweden, which won the election, although after a scandal where members of the party had hacked into a rival party's computer network, the Liberal Party lost almost six percentage points compared to the 2002 election, getting a total of 7.5% of the votes.

On 6 October 2006 Lars Leijonborg was made Minister for Education and Research in the Cabinet of Fredrik Reinfeldt. On 16 October 2006, Leijonborg temporarily took over the responsibilities for Minister for Culture Cecilia Stegö Chilò, who resigned that day. Eight days later, on 24 October, Lena Adelsohn Liljeroth assumed the post as Minister for Culture.

Leijonborg announced his resignation as party leader on 23 April 2007. He resigned from his post in September 2007. His successor as chairman, Minister for Schools Jan Björklund also took office as the new head of the Ministry of Education and Research. Leijonborg remained in the cabinet, keeping his political assignments as a minister for higher education and research but resigned from the government on 11 June 2009.

Leijonborg is a member of the congregationalist Mission Covenant Church of Sweden.

Bibliography
 Liberal feminism (2001)
 Liberala perspektiv i svenskt samhällsliv : 1967, 2007 och 2017 (2007)

References

External links
Lars Leijonborg - Folkpartiet
Riksdagen: Lars Leijonborg (fp)

1949 births
Leaders of political parties in Sweden
Living people
Male feminists
Members of the Riksdag 1979–1982
Members of the Riksdag 1985–1988
Members of the Riksdag 1988–1991
Members of the Riksdag 1991–1994
Members of the Riksdag 1994–1998
Members of the Riksdag 1998–2002
Members of the Riksdag 2002–2006
Members of the Riksdag 2006–2010
Members of the Riksdag from the Liberals (Sweden)
People from Täby Municipality
Stockholm University alumni
Swedish Christians
Swedish feminists
Swedish Ministers for Education